Down With Love is a 2010 Taiwanese drama starring Jerry Yan and Ella Chen. It was filmed on location in Taipei, Taiwan and Hangzhou, China.

It was first broadcast in Taiwan on free-to-air China Television (CTV) (中視) from 31 January 2010 to 23 May 2010, every Sunday at 22:00  to 23:30 and cable TV Gala Television (GTV) Variety Show/CH 28 (八大綜合台), from 2 February 2010 to 30 May 2010, every Sunday at 20:00 to 21:30.

Down With Love was nominated in 2010 for Best Marketing Programme (節目行銷獎) at the 45th Golden Bell Awards, Taiwan.

Synopsis
Handsome, renowned lawyer Xiang Yu Ping (Jerry Yan) is seen by others as cold and ruthless. After his  older brother dies in a car accident he has little choice but take in his brother's two orphaned children, Yu Fei and Yu Ting, whose mother had abandoned them soon after their birth. Every nanny he hires to care for them is either scared off by the mischievous children or ends up trying to seduce him. Fed up, Yu Ping asks his secretary, Yang Duo, to find a nanny that meets his requirements. Having lost all their wealth when their mother died and being abandoned by their father after racking up heavy debts, Yang Duo cannot ignore the fact that she needs the money and recommends her younger sister Yang Guo (Ella Chen) for the job, assuring Yu Ping that her tomboyish sister will not fall in love with him by lying that she is a lesbian. But the tables are turned on Yu Ping as he ends up falling in love with his new nanny.

Cast
 Jerry Yan - Xiang Yu Ping 項羽平
 Ella Chen - Yang Guo 楊果
 Kelly Huang - Yang Duo 楊朵
 Michael Zhang - Qi Ke Zhong 齊可中
 Chen Zi Han - Ding Hui Fan 丁卉凡
 Cindy Chi - Xiang Yu Fei 項昱霏 (Yu-ping's niece)
 Xiao Xiao Bin (小小彬) - Xiang Yu Ting 項昱霆 (Yu-ping's nephew)
 Amanda Zhou - Xu Yan Ling 徐雁玲
 Ku Pao-ming - Yan Bo Tong 楊伯通
 Yan Yi En - Liang Zhi Hao 梁志豪
 Jeno Liu - Su Fei 蘇斐
 Rong Rong (榮蓉) - Qi's mother
 Pang Yong Zhi - competition host
 Renzo Liu - lawyer
 Chien Te-men - rich man
 Kuang Ming Jie (況明潔) - rich man's wife
 Judy Zhou - A De 阿德 (Andy)
 Qian Shuai Jun (錢帥君) - babysitter
 Zhang Shan Wei (張善為) - gay client
 Vicky Chen - Yu Fei and Yu Ting's mother
 Du Shi Mei (杜詩梅) - Ding's agent
 Ma Guo Bi (馬國畢) - kidnapper
 Li Jia Wen - kidnapper
 Ada Pan (潘慧如) - Sandy

Multimedia

Music
 Opening theme song: "就想賴著妳" Jiu Xiang Lai Zhe Ni (Just Want To Depend On You) by Jerry Yan
 Ending theme song: "愛上你" Ai Shang Ni (In Love With You) by S.H.E

Insert songs:
 "礼物" (Gift) by Jeno Liu
 "崇拜你" (Adore You) by Jeno Liu
 "单细胞" (Unicellular) by Jiang Ming Juan (江明娟)
 "惹你开心" (Makes You Happy) by NewYorker Band

Books
 Down With Love TV Drama Novel /  就想賴著妳電視小說 - 
 Down With Love Photobook / 就想賴著妳幕後寫真 -

Production credits
 Producer: Ke Yi Qin 柯宜勤 / Fu Bin Xing 傅斌星 / Siu Ai Peng 隋愛朋
 Director: Ke Han Chen 柯翰辰
 Screenwriter: Cao Qing Ya 曹晴雅 / Fang Yi De 方懿德 / Lin Ya Qun 林雅淳 / Xie Qi 謝琪

International broadcast
The series was broadcast in Indonesia on Trans7 from September to November 2010.

This was also broadcast in the Philippines on ABS-CBN from October 25-December 31, 2010.

References

External links
 CTV Down With Love website
 GTV Down With Love website
 Down With Love official blog

China Television original programming
Gala Television original programming
2010 Taiwanese television series debuts
2010 Taiwanese television series endings
Television shows set in Hangzhou